, also called Jinji, was a  after En'ō and before Kangen. This period spanned the years from August 1240 to January 1243.

Change of era
 1240 :  The era name was changed to mark an event or a number of events. The previous era ended and a new one commenced in En'ō 2.

Events of the Ninji era
 1242 (Ninji 3, 10th day of the 1st month): In the 10th year of Shijō-tennōs reign (四条天皇10年), the emperor died suddenly; and despite a dispute over who should follow him as sovereign, contemporary scholars then construed that the succession (senso) was received by the second son of former Emperor Tsuchimikado.
 1242 (Ninji 3, 5th month): Emperor Go-Saga is said to have acceded to the throne (sokui).
 July 14, 1242 (Ninji 3, 15th day of the 6th month): Hōjō Yasutoki died at age 60.  From Gennin 1, or during 19 years, Yasutoki had been the regent or prime minister (shikken) of the Kamakura shogunate.  Yasutoki's son, Hōjō Tsunetoki succeeded him as shikken, but Kujō Yoritsune himself took charge of the bakufu.

Notes

References
 Nussbaum, Louis-Frédéric and Käthe Roth. (2005).  Japan encyclopedia. Cambridge: Harvard University Press. ;  OCLC 58053128
 Titsingh, Isaac. (1834). Nihon Odai Ichiran; ou,  Annales des empereurs du Japon.  Paris: Royal Asiatic Society, Oriental Translation Fund of Great Britain and Ireland. OCLC 5850691
 Varley, H. Paul. (1980). A Chronicle of Gods and Sovereigns: Jinnō Shōtōki of Kitabatake Chikafusa. New York: Columbia University Press. ;  OCLC 6042764

External links
 National Diet Library, "The Japanese Calendar" -- historical overview plus illustrative images from library's collection

Japanese eras
1240s in Japan